Centrifugal (a key concept in rotating systems) may refer to:

Centrifugal casting (industrial), Centrifugal casting (silversmithing), and Spin casting (centrifugal rubber mold casting), forms of centrifigual casting
Centrifugal clutch
Centrifugal compressor
Centrifugal evaporator
Centrifugal extractor
Centrifugal fan
Centrifugal force
Centrifugal force (rotating reference frame)
Centrifugal governor
Centrifugal gun
Centrifugal micro-fluidic biochip
Centrifugal pump
Centrifugal railway
Centrifugal switch
Centrifugal-type supercharger
Centrifugal water–oil separator
Centrifugation
Reactive centrifugal force

See also
Centrifuge
Fictitious force
History of centrifugal and centripetal forces
Centrifugal Funk, a 1991 album by the Mark Varney Project
Centrifugal structure, a concept in theoretical linguistics – see Lucien Tesnière
Centripetal (disambiguation)
Centrifugal speciation - a variant model of allopatric speciation